The Shotgun Players is a California East Bay regional theatre group located in Berkeley, California. It runs 6 to 7 productions per season. Its main stage is the Ashby Stage located in the Lorin District near the Ashby BART station.

About
The Shotgun Players was founded in 1992 by Artistic Director Patrick Dooley. Dooley and ten other actors formed the company in La Val's Pizza Shop. Before moving to a permanent location at the Ashby Stage in 2004, Shotgun Players performed in 44 different spaces. In December 2007, the Shotgun Players' Ashby Stage performance space in Berkeley's Lorin District became the first live theater venue in the nation to convert fully to solar power. The Ashby Stage hosts all main stage shows and the Champagne Staged Reading Series. With donations from the community, Shotgun Players bought 1201 University Ave, which was previously Serendipity Books, and converted the building into a rehearsal studio and workshop in 2015. In addition to rehearsing Shotgun Players' own productions, the Shotgun Studios is a rehearsal space and creative hub for emerging performing arts groups.

Shotgun Players' mission statement is to "create bold, relevant, affordable theatre that inspires and challenges audience and artist alike to re-examine our lives, our community, and the ever-changing world around us." The company is one of the few mid-sized theaters that maintains a core company of artists—including actors, directors, designers, playwrights, and stage managers. The Shotgun Players artistic company meets the first Sunday of every month and meets for an annual retreat.

Shotgun Players performs both new and classic plays, specializing in new works by contemporary playwrights, Greek plays, and Shakespeare.  It has produced many award-winning new plays: both Dog Act (2004) and Beowulf: A Thousand Years of Baggage (2008) were awarded the Will Glickman Award for Best New Play. The Salt Plays Part 1 and 2 (2010) as well as Phaedra (2011) and God's Plot (2011) have all been nominees. In 2011, San Francisco Weekly named Shotgun Players Best Theatre Company, and original works by company members are regularly included in the San Francisco Chronicle’s annual list of top ten productions.

Tickets can be purchased online or at the box office 2 hours prior to a show. There are various discounted tickets which are available to youth 25 and under, artists, and groups; these are also available during "pay-what-you-can previews" which take place during the first week of every show run. The theater has ADA seats available. Content advisories are provided to better prepare audiences to engage with each play.

In addition to producing award-winning shows, Shotgun Players has other community engagement programs. The Make a Difference (M.A.D.) program serves people 25 and under, striving to make theatre accessible and affordable to Bay Area youth by offering discounted show tickets, fellowship opportunities, and rehearsal space. Shotgun Players hosts general auditions for roles in upcoming productions.

Resident graphic artist Rich Black creates a new mural for each production, painting the facade on the corner of Martin Luther King Jr. Way and Ashby Ave.

Production history
Since 1992, Shotgun Players has produced over 140 plays, 30 of which were newly commissioned works.

Main stage shows 
Shotgun Players has one season per year and produces an average of 6 shows per season. In 2015, Shotgun Players announced a season of all works by women playwrights, including 6 full productions and 6 staged readings. In 2016, the company presented its season in repertory to celebrate its 25th anniversary.

Champagne Staged Reading Series  
The "Champagne Staged Reading Series" was introduced in 2015. This series serves as a pipeline to test new productions in two-night runs, performed on the current main stage production set. The Champagne Staged Reading Series is designed to provide opportunities to engage with more artists, thus providing increased exposure to new voices.

See also
American Conservatory Theater, San Francisco, California
Marin Theatre Company, Mill Valley, California
Berkeley Repertory Theatre, Berkeley, California
TheatreWorks, Palo Alto, California
San Francisco Playhouse, San Francisco, California
Aurora Theatre, Berkeley, California

References

External links
 
 Theatre Bay Area website

Theatre companies in Berkeley, California
Performing groups established in 1992
1992 establishments in California
Buildings and structures in Berkeley, California
League of Resident Theatres
Regional theatre in the United States
Tourist attractions in Berkeley, California
Culture of Berkeley, California
Theatres in the San Francisco Bay Area